Bonneval may refer to:

Places
France
 Bonneval, Eure-et-Loir
 Bonneval, Haute-Loire
 Bonneval, Savoie
 Bonneval-sur-Arc, Savoie

United States
 Bonneval, Wisconsin

Other uses
 Bonneval (horse), a New Zealand racehorse
 Bonneval (surname)
 Bonneval Abbey (Aveyron)
 Bonneval Abbey (Eure-et-Loir)